is a railway station on the Kagoshima Main Line operated by Kyushu Railway Company in Hioki, Kagoshima, Japan.

The station opened in 1913.

Lines 
Kyushu Railway Company
Kagoshima Main Line

JR

Adjacent stations 

Railway stations in Kagoshima Prefecture
Railway stations in Japan opened in 1913